Kevin Simon (born June 12, 1983) is an NFL scout for the Atlanta Falcons and the Director of Player Development for the University of Tennessee football team. He was a scout for the Dallas Cowboys from 2009-2016. He is an American football linebacker who was selected by the Washington Redskins in the last round of the 2006 NFL Draft. Kevin played at Tennessee from 2001-2004. He was a star linebacker and running back at De La Salle High School in Concord, California from 1997-2001.  He played in the first ever U.S. Army All-American Bowl on December 30, 2000 alongside fellow Tennessee Volunteer Cedric Houston.

External links
 Tennessee Volunteers bio
 "Vols LB Kevin Simon Tries to Stay Healthy," AP Online, August 20, 2005
 "Captain comeback: Kevin Simon has been knocked down by injury but always gets up; Now, he wants to show Tennessee's defense how to get it done, The Sporting News, August 19, 2005
 "Tennessee linebacker Simon out for season," USA Today, Sept. 22, 2004

1983 births
Living people
Sportspeople from Walnut Creek, California
Players of American football from California
American football linebackers
Tennessee Volunteers football players
Washington Redskins players
Dallas Cowboys scouts
De La Salle High School (Concord, California) alumni